Haná or Hanakia ( or Hanácko,  or Hanakei) is an ethnographic region in central Moravia in the Czech Republic. Its core area is located along the eponymous river of Haná, around the towns of Vyškov and Prostějov, but in common perception it roughly corresponds to the whole Upper Morava Vale, with Olomouc as its natural centre. In terms of the actual administrative division, Hanakia covers the most of Olomouc Region and adjacent parts of South Moravian Region and Zlín Region.

The so-called Malá Haná ("Lesser Hanakia") is located in the Boskovice Furrow (Boskovická brázda), west of Hanakia proper.

Haná is known for its agricultural fertility, rich costumes, and traditional customs. The Haná dialect (Hanakian dialect) is spoken in the region, and is part of the Central Moravian dialect group (which is even often referred to as the "Hanakian dialects"). This traditional dialect has been preserved and continues to be used even in printed publications from the region. Folk music from Haná is recognized locally by its lyrics in the Haná dialect.

Name
In the 18th and 19th century, the term "Hanack" (Hanák), was used for a Slavic people, peasants, in Moravia. Today, the Czech term Hanáci is used for an ethnographic group inhabiting the Haná region.

Significant places 
Olomouc - the centre of Haná and the historical capital of Moravia with a pilgrimage site of Svatý Kopeček
Přerov - industrial city, well known as an archeologically significant place where mammoth hunters settled in Předmostí.
Prostějov - nicknamed the "Manchester of Haná" and, prior to the Holocaust, "Jerusalem of Haná".
Kroměříž - nicknamed the "Athens of Haná".
Vyškov - formerly called "Moravian Versailles" or "Versailles of Haná".
Litovel - nicknamed the "Venice of Haná".
Litovelské pomoraví Protected Landscape Area
Příkazy - the Haná Open Air Museum
Kojetín
Náměšť na Hané
Hulín
Holešov

See also 

 Moravia
 Olomouc Region
 South Moravian Region
 Zlín Region
 Hanakian Moravian Slovakia (:cs:Hanácké Slovácko)

References

External links 
  Central Moravia  
  Folklore from Haná 
  Folklore group Hanačka 

  about the Haná dialect

Olomouc Region
South Moravian Region
Zlín Region